Incisura rosea, common name the rosy slit shell, is a species of minute sea snail, a marine gastropod mollusc in the family Scissurellidae.

Description
The shell grows to a height of 1.2 mm.

Distribution
This marine species occurs off New Zealand.

References

 Powell A. W. B., New Zealand Mollusca, William Collins Publishers Ltd, Auckland, New Zealand 1979 
 Geiger D.L. (2012) Monograph of the little slit shells. Volume 1. Introduction, Scissurellidae. pp. 1-728. Volume 2. Anatomidae, Larocheidae, Depressizonidae, Sutilizonidae, Temnocinclidae. pp. 729–1291. Santa Barbara Museum of Natural History Monographs Number 7

External links

 

Scissurellidae
Gastropods of New Zealand
Endemic fauna of New Zealand
Gastropods described in 1904
Endemic molluscs of New Zealand